The neuromatrix theory of pain states that the perception of painful stimuli does not result from the brain's passive registration of tissue trauma, but from its active generation of subjective experiences through a network of neurons known as the neuromatrix. The theory was proposed by Ronald Melzack in 1990.

Recent research has identified the anterior cingulate cortex as a critical part of the neuromatrix.

Criticism
Criticism of this concept stem from its lack of conceptual originality. For example:

See also 

 Gate control theory

References 

Pain